Sir Henry St John Halford, 3rd Baronet (9 August 1828 – 4 January 1897) was an English landowner and expert rifleman.

Life
He was born the son of Sir Henry Halford, 2nd Baronet, MP for Leicestershire South, whom he succeeded in 1868. He was educated at Eton College and Merton College, Oxford, where he graduated B.A. in 1849. On his father's death he inherited Wistow Hall in Leicestershire, where he thereafter lived.

In 1860 he took command of a company of the Leicestershire volunteers, becoming colonel of the battalion in 1862. He held the office, with a 10-year break, until 1891, when he was made honorary colonel. In 1886, he was awarded C.B.

He was picked High Sheriff of Leicestershire for 1872, and in 1889 was appointed the first Chairman of Leicestershire County Council, a post he held until 1893.

Halford's main interest was rifle shooting and the development of rifle technology. In its obituary, The Times of London dubbed Halford “the father of rifle-shooting”, noting:

He was an excellent shot and won several tournaments. In 1877 and 1882 he was captain of a team of eight who shot against an American team at Creedmoor Rifle Range in New York. Halford also took part in the Creedmoor match in 1883. He was for many years Chairman of the National Rifle Association.

He was also a member of the government Small Arms Committee which recommended the adoption in the Army of the Lee-Metford rifle. Sir Henry had worked closely with engineer William Ellis Metford, inventor of the rifle, establishing a workshop and firing range at Wistow Hall to help with the experimental work. Another collaborator on the project was his friend Thomas Fremantle, 3rd Baron Cottesloe, who was also an expert shot. The team made significant improvements in rifling and bullet design.

Family
Halford married Elizabeth Ursula, daughter of William John Bagshawe but had no children. The baronetcy thereby passed briefly to his brother John Frederick, who died later the same year. Sir Henry left Wistow Hall in his will to Baron Cottesloe, whose descendants still own the property.

References

Further reading

Research Press Biographical articles - Henry Halford

1828 births
1897 deaths
People from Harborough District
People educated at Eton College
Alumni of Merton College, Oxford
Baronets in the Baronetage of the United Kingdom
English landowners
High Sheriffs of Leicestershire
British male sport shooters
Companions of the Order of the Bath
Sportspeople from Leicestershire
19th-century British businesspeople
People of the National Rifle Association